Myoblast city (Mbc) is the Drosophila melanogaster ortholog of the mammalian protein Dock180. Mutant mbc embryos exhibit defects in dorsal closure, cytoskeletal organization, myogenesis, and neural development.

Discovery 
The Myoblast city locus was identified by deletion mapping, using this technique researchers were able to isolate the location of the gene on the right arm of the third chromosome. During the process four recessive alleles of Mbc were found; mbcc1, mbcc2, mbcc3, mbcs4, all of which are lethal and the D. melanogaster embryos fail to hatch.

During the first 9-10 hours of development, embryos with the mutant Mbc alleles show the same myosin expression as wild-type embryos. However, at about the 11th hour, most myoblasts fail to fuse. As development progresses, some myoblasts show signs of fusion, such as elongation and having multiple nuclei; but some remain round. After 13-14 hours of development, most cells in mutant embryos that failed to fuse lose myosin expression.

References

External links
 

Insect proteins
Drosophila melanogaster genes